Pho Prathap Chang is a district (amphoe) in the western part of Phichit province, central Thailand.

History
The government split off some parts of Mueang Phichit and Pho Thale Districts and formed the new Pho Prathap Chang minor district (king amphoe) on 24 June 1967. It was upgraded to a full district on 3 September 1973.

The district was named after the temple (Wat) Pho Prathap Chang, which was built by King Suea (Tiger King, Sanpet VIII, Suriyenthrathibodi) of Ayutthaya at his birthplace.

Geography
Neighboring districts are (from the north clockwise) Sam Ngam, Mueang Phichit, Taphan Hin, Bueng Na Rang of Phichit Province and Bueng Samakkhi of Kamphaeng Phet province.

The important water resource is the Yom River.

Administration
The district is divided into seven sub-districts (tambon), which are further subdivided into 99 villages (muban). Pho Prathap Chang is a township (thesaban tambon) and covers parts of the tambon Pho Prathap Chang, Phai Tha Pho and Wang Chik. There are a further seven tambon administrative organizations (TAO).

References

External links
amphoe.com (Thai)

Pho Prathap Chang